Plasmodiophora is a genus in the phylum of cercozoa in the class Phytomyxea.

It includes the species Plasmodiophora brassicae, which causes the disease cabbage clubroot.

References

External links
 Tree of Life Plasmodiophorida

Cercozoa genera
Plasmodiophorid genera
Parasitic rhizaria
Parasites of plants